Sergey Alexandrovich Klimov (born 7 July 1980 in Saint Petersburg) is a Russian former professional racing cyclist, who rode professionally between 2001 and 2014 for the Itera, Lokomotiv,  and  teams. He now works as a directeur sportif for UCI Women's Continental Team .

Major results

Road

2001
 1st Stage 3 Tour de Normandie
2003
 1st Stage 5b Volta Tarragona
 4th Overall Ster Elektrotoer
2007
 2nd Eindhoven Team Time Trial
 7th Tre Valli Varesine
2008
 7th Overall Settimana Ciclistica Lombarda
1st Stage 1 (TTT)
2010
 1st Stage 3 (TTT) Vuelta a Burgos
2012
 7th Giro di Toscana
2013
 3rd Overall Five Rings of Moscow
1st Stage 3
 7th Giro di Toscana
2014
 2nd Overall Grand Prix Udmurtskaya Pravda
 4th Memorial Oleg Dyachenko
 8th Overall Five Rings of Moscow

Grand Tour general classification results timeline

Track

 2002
 1st Team pursuit, UCI World Cup Classics, Moscow (with Alexei Markov, Alexander Serov and Denis Smyslov)
 2003
 1st Team pursuit, UCI World Cup Classics, Moscow (with Alexei Markov, Alexander Serov and Nikita Eskov)
 2004–2005
 3rd Team pursuit, UCI World Cup Classics, Moscow (with Nikolay Trusov, Anton Mindlin and Alexander Serov)
2005–2006
 UCI World Cup Classics
1st, Team pursuit, Los Angeles (with Nikolay Trusov, Ivan Rovny and Alexander Serov)
2nd, Team pursuit, Moscow (with Nikolay Trusov, Anton Mindlin and Alexander Serov)
2006–2007
 UCI World Cup Classics
1st, Points race, Manchester
3rd, Manchester Manchester, Madison (with Nikolay Trusov)

References

External links
 

Cyclists from Saint Petersburg
Russian male cyclists
Olympic cyclists of Russia
Cyclists at the 2000 Summer Olympics
1980 births
Living people
Lesgaft National State University of Physical Education, Sport and Health alumni
Directeur sportifs